Mihai Olteanu (born 14 April 1980 in Piteşti) is a former Romanian footballer., he played all his career for CS Mioveni.

References

External links
 
 
 

Living people
1980 births
Sportspeople from Pitești
Romanian footballers
Association football defenders
Liga I players
Liga II players
CS Mioveni players
Romanian football managers
CS Mioveni managers